Pierre Duval (1618–1683) was a French geographer.

Pierre Duval was born in Abbeville. He was the nephew and pupil of the geographer Nicolas Sanson. Encouraged by Louis XIV to move to Paris, he later became Geographe Ordinaire du Roy.

References

People from Abbeville
1618 births
1683 deaths
French geographers